Bassett is an unincorporated community in the town of Randall in southwestern Kenosha County, Wisconsin, United States. The Randall Town Hall is in the community.

History
Bassett was first settled by Henry Bassett and his son Reuben in 1842, six years before Wisconsin statehood, when  were purchased. The population accelerated when the Kenosha and Rockford Railroad was built through the community in the later 19th century, and Henry Bassett contributed land for that purpose. The railroad was abandoned in May 1939. The community was originally known as Bassett's Station and then Bassetts.

Notes

External links
 

Unincorporated communities in Wisconsin
Unincorporated communities in Kenosha County, Wisconsin